Passo d'Areia is a neighborhood (bairro) in the city of Porto Alegre, the state capital of Rio Grande do Sul in Brazil. Two big shopping malls of the city, Iguatemi and Bourbon Country, are located here.

Notable people
 Elis Regina, singer

External links

 Porto Alegre City Homepage

Neighbourhoods in Porto Alegre